Kristina Tomić (born 29 March 1995) is a Croatian taekwondo practitioner. She won the bronze medal at the 2017 World Taekwondo Championships on the women's flyweight category. She suffers from type 1 diabetes.

She competed in the women's featherweight event at the 2022 World Taekwondo Championships held in Guadalajara, Mexico.

References

External links
 

1995 births
Croatian female taekwondo practitioners
Living people
Mediterranean Games silver medalists for Croatia
Mediterranean Games medalists in taekwondo
Competitors at the 2018 Mediterranean Games
World Taekwondo Championships medalists
European Taekwondo Championships medalists
Taekwondo practitioners at the 2020 Summer Olympics
Olympic taekwondo practitioners of Croatia
21st-century Croatian women